Series 41 of University Challenge began on 4 July 2011, and aired on BBC Two. Below is a list of the matches played with their scores and outcomes.

Results
 Winning teams are highlighted in bold.
 Teams with green scores (winners) returned in the next round, while those with red scores (losers) were eliminated.
 Teams with orange scores must win one more match to return in the next round (current highest scoring losers, teams that won their first quarter final match, teams that won their second quarter final match having lost their first, or teams that won their first quarter final match and lost their second).
 Teams with yellow scores indicate that two further matches must be played and won (teams that lost their first quarter final match).
 A score in italics indicates a match decided on a tie-breaker question.

First round

Highest Scoring Losers play-offs

Second round

Quarter-finals

Semi-finals

Final

 The trophy and title were awarded to the Manchester team comprising Luke Kelly, Michael McKenna, Tristan Burke and Paul Joyce.
 The trophy was presented by Camilla, Duchess of Cornwall at Clarence House.

Spin-off: Christmas Special 2011
Starting this year, a Christmas special sequence was aired featuring distinguished alumni. Out of 5 first-round winners, the top 4 highest-scoring teams progress to the semi-finals. The teams consist of celebrities who represent their alma maters.

Results
Winning teams are highlighted in bold.
Teams with green scores (winners) returned in the next round, while those with red scores (losers) were eliminated.
Teams with grey scores won their match but did not achieve a high enough score to proceed to the next round.
A score in italics indicates a match decided on a tie-breaker question.

First Round

Standings for the winners

Semi-finals

Final

The Trinity College, Cambridge team of Robin Bhattacharyya, Daisy Goodwin, John Lloyd, and Edward Stourton beat the University of Warwick team of Vadim Jean, Daisy Christodoulou, Christian Wolmar and Carla Mendonça.

References

External links
 University Challenge Homepage
 Blanchflower Results Table

2012
2011 British television seasons
2012 British television seasons